Trilobozoa (meaning "three-lobed animals") is a phylum of extinct mobile animals that were originally classified into the Cnidaria. The basic body plan of Trilobozoa is often a tri-radial or radial sphere-shaped form with lobes radiating from its centre.

Fossils of trilobozoans are restricted to marine strata of the Late Ediacaran period.

History and interpretations 

Originally, both Fedonkin and Runnegar presumed that there were 2-3 families within the Trilobozoa, those families being Albumaresidae Fedonkin, 1985 and Tribrachididae Runnegar, 1992. Although, affinities with the Conulariida were made because of the conulariids	
 possessing similar three-fold symmetry. Mikhail Fedonkin later classified the Trilobozoa as a class of the Phylum Coelenterata. Most of the members of what is now the modern day classification for Trilobozoa were thought to have originally been free swimming Jellyfish. Tribrachidium was once interpreted as a Edrioasteroid Echinoderm, although with the discovery of the related Albumares and Anfesta (along with better-preserved White Sea specimens) it became apparent to Mikhail Fedonkin that all of the organisms formed one Phylum (originally class) of tri-radially symmetrical  enigmatic organisms from the Ediacaran. The eventual split of Coelenterata into the Phylums Cnidaria and Ctenophora led the Trilobozoa to obtain a Phylum level of affinities.

The members of the Trilobozoa are now thought to be sessile, benthic organisms of unknown affinities, and are a subject open for interpretations and debate.

Description 
Trilobozoans had a tri-radial shield-like body that had three antimeres which consisted of a cluster of grooves on their outer surface and within their inner cavity. Most of the members of the Trilobozoa possessed bifurcating concave areas internally that were all separated by sharp ridges. These structures were more likely stiff and culticular rather than elastic internal bodies or membranes even though those structures may have been resistant, they also could've corresponded to collapsed chambers that can be observed within the related genera Albumares and Anfesta. In Tribrachidium, the sediment preserving the animal penetrated from above only within areas between those organs. The spiral-like orientation of the internal bodies of trilobozoans suggests that they were modified from an originally longitudinal to the axis which resulted in the deposition of the organs.

Albumares 

Albumares brunsae represents a form first described from the White Sea of Russia by Mikhail A. Fedonkin in 1976. In life, Albumares most likely had an umbrella-like shape with tri-radial symmetry along with three ridges radiating from its centre. Fossils of Albumares are known from Russia and South Australia and preserve 100 small ( each) marginal tentacles. From the centre of the lobes arise three canals that split at least 4 times across the body. The then split canals then split until they reach the outer margin of the body. Albumares is similar and may be a close relative of the Anfesta

Anfesta 

Anfesta stankovskii represents a small ( hemispherical-shaped form with flattened, three-fold symmetry. Similarly to Albumares, three long sausage-shaped lobes radiate from its centre that are all separated by an angle of 120 degrees. The lobes taper at both their proximal and distal ends, which divide the organism into a number of narrow bodies that are divisible by three. Some specimens from both Australia and Russia preserve tentacles (canals) similar to that of Albumares. Unlike Albumares and Skinnera, Anfesta is more oval-shaped and discoidal rather than being dominantly tri-lobate.

Hallidaya 

Hallidaya brueri constitutes as a discoidal form that is restricted to Mount Skinner of the Northern Territory of Australia. The fossils were preserved as disc-shaped moulds on the sandstone. Specimens commonly show three central depressions connected by a much smaller, pouch-shaped one around the perimeter of the disk by multiple canals radiating from its centre. Hallidaya and Skinnera share common morphological characteristics with each other and are most likely close relatives.

Rugoconites 

Rugoconites is a genus of oval- circular-shaped preserved in high relief about  six or more centimetres in diameter. The shape of Rugoconites is different in both of its species; R. enigmaticus Glaessner & Wade 1966 is more dome shaped and R. tenuirugosus Wade 1972 is more flatter although bigger. Wade (1972) interpreted the multiple lobes of Rugoconites as being tentacles. The multiple bifurcating lobes radiating from a centre served to distinguish Rugoconites from the sponge Palaeophragmodictya the lobes were then re-interpreted as being traces of a Gastrovascular system. However this idea was countered by Sepkoski (2002) who went on to actually classify the genus into the Cnidaria instead of the Porifera.  Ivantstov & Fedonkin (2002) went on to classify Rugoconites into the Trilobozoa by suggesting it had tri-radial symmetry.

Skinerra 

Skinnera brooksi defines small discoidal fossils preserved as composite moulds on sandstone. Fossils are characterized by three radially arranged pouch-shaped depressions that are interpreted as a stomach similar to that seen in Hallidaya. These depressions are then connected to an outer rim by approximately 15 smaller pouches along the disk by canals. Skinnera and Hallidaya are considered to be close relatives.

Tribrachidium 

Tribrachidium heraldicum is a small (3 to 40 millimetres) tri-radially symmetrical form often preserved on the base of sandstones and often show a three-lobed, circular animal preserved in it. The central part of T. heraldicum has three hooked ridges (or arms) that make up the lobes; the arms are covered by numerous branched furrows that were interpreted as tentacles.

See also

 List of Ediacaran genera

References

External links
 Ediacara Assemblage University of Bristol

 
Ediacaran life
Proterozoic animals
Ediacaran first appearances
Animal phyla
Vendobionta
Ediacaran
Prehistoric animal taxa
Ediacaran Europe
Enigmatic prehistoric animal genera